Minuscule 586 (in the Gregory-Aland numbering), ε 417 (von Soden), is a Greek minuscule manuscript of the New Testament, on parchment. Palaeographically it has been assigned to the 14th century. The manuscript is lacunose. It was labeled by Scrivener as 455.

Description 

The codex contains the text of the four Gospels on 239 leaves (size ) with only one lacuna (Matthew 1:1–20). It is written in one column per page, 20 lines per page, in neat and small hand.

There is not a division according to the Ammonian Sections and the Eusebian Canons; without pictures and decorations. It has one leaf added by a later hand with Gospel Harmony.

Text 

The Greek text of the codex is a representative of the Byzantine text-type. Hermann von Soden classified it to the textual family Kr. Aland placed it in Category V.
According to Wisse's Profile Method it represents the textual family Kr in Luke 1, Luke 10, and Luke 20.

History 

The manuscript currently housed in at the Biblioteca Estense (G. 5, α M 9. 14 (II A 5)), at Modena.

See also 

 List of New Testament minuscules
 Biblical manuscript
 Textual criticism

References

Further reading 

 

Greek New Testament minuscules
14th-century biblical manuscripts
Biblioteca Estense